Brandys  or Brandýs may refer to:

Brandys (surname)
 Brandýs nad Labem-Stará Boleslav, town in the Central Bohemian Region of the Czech Republic
 Brandýs nad Orlicí, town in the Pardubice Region of the Czech Republic